= Justice of the peace (Monaco) =

Court of the first instance in Monaco

The Justice of the Peace (French: La Justice de Paix) is a court of the first instance in the Principality of Monaco. The Justice of the Peace resolves disputes concerning the election of employee representatives, sealing the documents, payment orders, personal and possessory actions, attachments of wages, earnings and arrears as well as ruling on disputes with a value no higher than a specified amount, currently set at €4,600. The Justice of Peace rules in first and last recourse in litigations where penalty is lesser that which is set by the law.

In criminal matters, the justice of peace presides over the Police Court. Unlike the Court of First Instance (French: Tribunal de première instance), which has general jurisdiction, the Justice of the Peace can only adjudicate on matters which are specifically assigned to it by law.
